Gorsky (masculine), Gorskaya (feminine), or Gorskoye (neuter) is the name of several rural localities in Russia:
Gorsky, Arkhangelsk Oblast, a vyselok in Rostovsky Selsoviet of Ustyansky District of Arkhangelsk Oblast
Gorsky, Krasnodar Krai, a settlement in Tbilissky Rural Okrug of Tbilissky District of Krasnodar Krai
Gorsky, Rostov Oblast, a khutor in Nikolayevskoye Rural Settlement of Konstantinovsky District of Rostov Oblast
Gorsky, Samara Oblast, a settlement in Bogatovsky District of Samara Oblast
Gorsky, Volgograd Oblast, a khutor in Dobrinsky Selsoviet of Uryupinsky District of Volgograd Oblast
Gorskoye, Krasnodar Krai, a selo under the administrative jurisdiction of  Dzhugbsky Settlement Okrug,  Tuapsinsky District, Krasnodar Krai
Gorskoye, Leningrad Oblast, a logging depot settlement under the administrative jurisdiction of  Kamennogorskoye Settlement Municipal Formation,  Vyborgsky District, Leningrad Oblast
Gorskoye, Pskov Oblast, a village in Ostrovsky District of Pskov Oblast
Gorskoye, Tula Oblast, a village in Mikhaylovskaya Volost of Kurkinsky District of Tula Oblast
Gorskaya, Arkhangelsk Oblast, a village in Ust-Padengsky Selsoviet of Shenkursky District of Arkhangelsk Oblast
Gorskaya, Republic of Karelia, a village in Medvezhyegorsky District of the Republic of Karelia
Gorskaya, Krasnoyarsk Krai, a village in Verkhnepashinsky Selsoviet of Yeniseysky District of Krasnoyarsk Krai
Gorskaya, Perm Krai, a village in Permsky District of Perm Krai